Clareville is a suburb in northern Sydney, in the state of New South Wales, Australia. Clareville is 36 kilometres north-east of the Sydney central business district, in the local government area of Northern Beaches Council. Clareville is part of the Northern Beaches region.

Clareville is bordered by Avalon Beach, Bilgola Plateau and Newport. Clareville Beach and Taylors Point are localities within the suburb.

Clareville 
In the 1830s, two large land grants were made to a Catholic priest, Father John Joseph Therry (1790–1864), who had arrived in Sydney in May 1820. The grant included what is now known as Clareville. It is thought that the suburb has historically been accessed by the water. In the early 1920s, the area was subdivided and Sydney residents purchased holiday homes. In the 1950s, with the increase in motor car use, the area became a residential zone. Houses in the area are now expensive, with many having water frontages and views.

Heritage listings
Clareville has a number of heritage-listed sites, including:
 62 Chisholm Road: Hy Brasil

Demographics
According to the 2016 census of Population, there were 742 people in Clareville. 73.5% of people were born in Australia. The next most common countries of birth were England 10.7%, New Zealand 1.8%, United States of America 1.6%, South Africa 1.4% and Sweden 1.1%. 89.8% of people spoke only English at home. Other languages spoken at home included German 1.5%, French 1.3%, Danish 0.9%, Turkish 0.9% and Arabic 0.8%. The most common responses for religion in Clareville were No Religion, so described 40.7%, Anglican 22.0%, Catholic 19.5%, Uniting Church 5.8% and Not stated 4.6%.

Residents
 Norah Telford Burnard (1902-1979), school dental supervisor and journal editor
 Bob Norton OBE (1922–1992), a former president of the Royal Australasian College of Dental Surgeons lived in Clareville.
 Morris West (1916–1999), author.

References

External links 
 Pittwater Council
 Father John Joseph Therry

Suburbs of Sydney
Northern Beaches Council